Rafael Vaca Váldez (born 1934) is a former Mexican cyclist. He competed in the individual and team road race events at the 1956 Summer Olympics.

References

External links
 

1934 births
Living people
Mexican male cyclists
Olympic cyclists of Mexico
Cyclists at the 1956 Summer Olympics
Place of birth missing (living people)